Third Baptist Church is a historic church at 1546 5th Street and Q Street NW in the Shaw neighbourhood of north-western Washington, DC.

It was built in 1893 in Late Gothic Revival style and added to the National Register of Historic Places in 2008. The church is the third oldest Black Baptist Church in Washington, DC and the oldest Black Baptist building still standing.

References

Baptist churches in Washington, D.C.
Churches on the National Register of Historic Places in Washington, D.C.
Churches completed in 1893